Claudio Lusuardi (born 30 December 1949 in Modena) is a former Italian Grand Prix motorcycle road racer. His best year was in 1982 when he finished in third place in the 50cc world championship, behind Stefan Dörflinger and Eugenio Lazzarini. After retiring from competition, he took on the role of race team manager for Cagiva.

References 

1949 births
Sportspeople from Modena
Living people
Italian motorcycle racers
50cc World Championship riders
125cc World Championship riders